The United States's Sculpin nuclear test series was a group of 7 nuclear tests conducted between October 1990 and September 1991. These tests followed the Operation Aqueduct series and preceded the Operation Julin series.

Shots

Distant Zenith

Shot Distant Zenith included the experiment Hydroplus. The Defense Nuclear Agency (DNA) developed a means of verifying non-standard nuclear tests using ground peak stress and velocity at several ranges from a possible detonation point using computer hydrocodes. These codes required calibration data which was gathered at Distant Zenith. Further Hydroplus experiments were conducted in shot Hunters Trophy of Operation Julin.

Full list of shots

Gallery

References

Explosions in 1990
Explosions in 1991
1990 in military history
1991 in military history
Sculpin